List of public & private, girls & boys, elementary & high schools inside Isfahan, Iran.

Non-Public girls high schools

District 1 
 Motahhari High School
 Pardis High School
 Roshangar High School
 Taybat High School

District 2 

 Hadaf High School
 Noor Al-Absar High School
 Shaygan High School
 Marzieh High School
 Molood Kaaba High School
 Imam Amir Al-Momenin High School
 Mehro Danesh High School
 Anwar Al-Quran High School
 Asre danesh High School

District 3 

 Raisi High School
 Gozine javan High school
 Isfahan University High School (formerly Edalat) 
 Pooyandegan High School
 Golestan High School
 Shahrbanoo High School
 Azarmidakht High School
 Faraz High School
 Shayan High School
 High School of Tamadon
 Imam Sadegh High School
 Sedaghat High School
 Nick Ahang High School
 White Pen High School
 Shahrzad High School
 Kowsar Danesh High School
 Atrat Sepahan High School

District 4 

 High school mazhare danesh
 High school va al-asr
 Tahora High School
 High school honaramoozan
 Shokooh Zeinab High School

District 5 

 Danaskhan High School
 High School Gozine javan Mehr
 jame high school for girls
 Imam Mohammad Baqir High School
 Sayed Al-Shuhada High School
 Azadi High School
 Fatemeh High School
 Al Zahra High School
 Shamim Danesh High School
 Dr. Azidhak High School
 Pishgaman Saba High School
 Gulab High School

References

External links
https://www.medu.ir/fa/news/ctg-id/44962/english-isfahan-education?ocode=35003904

Schools in Isfahan